The Special Operations Regiment is a regiment of the Land Component of the Belgian Armed Forces. Its headquarters is located in Heverlee. It was known as the Light Brigade until 3 July 2018 when it was renamed. The Special Operations Regiment is Belgium's special operations and rapid response unit.

History
In January 1942 the first Belgian parachutists were trained at RAF Ringway, Manchester, England. The same year, the Belgian Independent Parachute Company was established and commanded by Captain Eddy Blondeel. Later, the unit was incorporated into Britain's Special Air Service Brigade and became the 5th Special Air Service (known as the Belgian SAS squadron). The SAS squadron was active during World War II until enemy activities were discontinued. They performed several operations using the parachute regiment and armoured jeeps. Thereafter, the unit also took part in counter-intelligence operations.

On 21 September 1945 5th SAS was transferred from the British Army to the newly reformed Belgian Army. Renamed as the Regiment of Parachutists SAS, they served independently as a highly mobile airborne unit until 1952 when the regiment merged with the Commando Regiment to form a battalion of the Para Commando Regiment.

The Regiment was transformed in 1989 to the Para Commando Brigade. A few years later in 2002, it became the IRCC (Immediate Reaction Capability Command). After the next transformation in 2003, it became the Light Brigade and was stationed in Marche-en-Famenne.

On July 3, 2018, the Light Brigade was transformed into the Special Operations Regiment and its headquarter moved to Heverlee.

Organisation

 Special Operations Regiment in Marche-en-Famenne.
 Headquarters and Staff Company, carrying the traditions of the 4th Commando Battalion in Heverlee.
 Special Forces Group, carrying the traditions of the 1st Paratroopers Battalion in Heverlee.
 2nd Commando Battalion Para Commando, in Flawinne.
 3rd Paratroopers Battalion Para Commando, in Tielen.
6th Communication and Information Systems Group, in Peutie.
 Paratroopers Training Centre, at Schaffen Air Base.
 Commando Training Centre, in Marche-les-Dames.

Other units with Para Commandos 
Other units personnel from the Belgian Armed Forces that support the 2nd Commando Battalion and 3rd Paratrooper Battalion, who as well as their primary trade have to complete the Para commandos "A" certificate training and in so doing, earn their Parachutists and Commando Brevets. Some of these units are currently in the process of being integrated into the new SOR (Special Operations Regiment) structure and as such will no longer be dependent upon the non-paracommando HQ of their former unit.

 Artillery Battalion selected members of:
 Joint Fires Observer (Land Air Integration) battery;
 Mortar battery (Qualified members of both batteries wear a Sherwood green beret with Artillery badge).
 11th Engineer Battalion
 Light combat engineers company (68th Company) (wear a Sherwood green beret with Engineers badge)
 14th Medical Battalion of the Medical Component 
 Medical (Special Operations Regiment) company (wear a maroon beret with unique Para Commando Medical badge)
Logistics (Maintenance / Repair, Transportation and Supply) personnel attached to units within or support the Special Operations Regiment (wear a Sherwood green beret with special operations regiments badge).
 6th signaling battalion (communication and information systems) supports the regiment with all means of communication. (wear a maroon beret with cis badge)

References

Special Brigade, 7
Military units and formations established in 2011
2011 establishments in Belgium
Marche-en-Famenne